Joseph R. Redmond (born c. 1945) is a former American football coach. He served as the head football coach at the University of Maryland Eastern Shore (1978), Central State University in Wilberforce, Ohio (1979–1980), Texas Southern University (1981–1983), Knoxville College in Knoxville, Tennessee (1991–1994), and Morris Brown College in Atlanta, Georgia (1995).

In 1973, he became the first African American football coach to be named offensive coordinator at an NCAA Division I school.

Head coaching record

College

References

Year of birth missing (living people)
Living people
Central State Marauders football coaches
Florida A&M Rattlers football coaches
Knoxville Bulldogs football coaches
Marshall Thundering Herd football coaches
Maryland Eastern Shore Hawks football coaches
Morris Brown Wolverines football coaches
Northern Illinois Huskies football coaches
Texas Southern Tigers football coaches
High school football coaches in Florida
Junior college football coaches in the United States
Fisk University alumni